Mike Elliott (born April 3, 1942) is an American cross-country skier. He competed at the 1964 Winter Olympics, the 1968 Winter Olympics and the 1972 Winter Olympics.

References

1942 births
Living people
American male cross-country skiers
Olympic cross-country skiers of the United States
Cross-country skiers at the 1964 Winter Olympics
Cross-country skiers at the 1968 Winter Olympics
Cross-country skiers at the 1972 Winter Olympics
People from Durango, Colorado